Old Town House may refer to:

Old Town House (Parsonsfield, Maine), a National Register of Historic Places listing in York County, Maine
Old Town House (Union, Maine)
Old Town House (Marblehead, Massachusetts)
Old County Courthouse or Old Town House, in Plymouth, Massachusetts, built in 1749
Old Town House, a former name of Scaplen's Court in Poole, Dorset, England
Old Town House built on Greenmarket Square, Cape Town in 1755